Japanese Whispers is the second compilation album by British group The Cure. It was released in late 1983 by Fiction Records.

It includes the singles "Let's Go to Bed", "The Walk" and "The Lovecats". The other tracks are the B-sides of these singles, although "Mr. Pink Eyes" (the second B-side for "The Lovecats") was not included. The songs were recorded when the band was in a transitional phase after bassist Simon Gallup left following a tour to promote the previous album, Pornography. Beginning with these singles, Lol Tolhurst switched from drums to keyboards, a role he kept until his departure in 1989.

For the tracks from the "Let's Go to Bed" and "The Walk" singles, the Cure was a duo consisting of Tolhurst and Robert Smith, with the addition of session drummer Steve Goulding (a member of Graham Parker and the Rumour) for the tracks from "Let's Go to Bed". For "The Lovecats" single, a full band was assembled with the addition of bassist/producer Phil Thornalley, who had worked with the band on Pornography, and drummer Andy Anderson, a lineup which would continue for the Concert live album.

In 1986, the singles' lead tracks were included in the Standing on a Beach compilation album, while all of the B-sides were included in the 2004 B-sides and rarities box set Join the Dots.

Japanese Whispers was the first Cure album to enter the Billboard 200 in the US, in early 1984.

Track listing
All tracks written by Robert Smith and Laurence Tolhurst except as noted.

 "Let's Go to Bed" – 3:34
 "The Dream" (Smith) – 3:13
 "Just One Kiss" – 4:09
 "The Upstairs Room" – 3:31
 "The Walk" – 3:30
 "Speak My Language" – 2:41
 "Lament" (Smith) – 4:20
 "The Love Cats" (Smith) – 3:40

Personnel 
Robert Smith – vocals, guitars, keyboards, bass guitar
Lol Tolhurst – keyboards, drum machine, vibraphone (6, 8)
Steve Goulding – drums (1, 3)
Phil Thornalley – double bass (6, 8)
Andy Anderson – drums (6, 8)

Certifications

References

1983 compilation albums
The Cure compilation albums
Albums produced by Steve Nye
Fiction Records compilation albums
Sire Records compilation albums